Say It Loud is the fourth album by the electronic musician Grant Kwiecinski under the pseudonym GRiZ. It was released on March 31, 2015 under his own label All Good Records.

Track listing

References

GRiZ albums
2015 albums